The 1884 United States House of Representatives elections in Florida were held on November 4 for the 49th Congress.  These elections were held at the same time as the presidential election and the election for governor.

Background
The 1882 elections had sent one Democrat and one Republican to the House to represent Florida.  That would prove to be the last Congressional election won by a Republican in Florida until 1954.

Election results
Both incumbents ran for re-election, one of whom was re-elected.  One seat changed from Republican to Democratic control

1st District

Results

2nd District

Results

See also
United States House of Representatives elections, 1886

References

1884
Florida
United States House of Representatives